Kevin Qi Han (born November 25, 1972) is a Chinese American badminton player who won the bronze medal in the inaugural men's singles competition at the 1995 Pan American Games, followed by the gold medal four years later in Winnipeg, Manitoba, Canada.

Career

Olympics
Han competed in badminton at the 2004 Summer Olympics in men's doubles with partner Howard Bach.  They defeated Dorian James and Stewart Carson of South Africa in the first round, then were defeated in the round of 16 by Jens Eriksen and Martin Lundgaard Hansen of Denmark.

Pan Am Games

Kevin Han won a bronze medal, a silver medal and two gold medals at the Pan American Games.
In 1995 he won bronze in the inaugural men's singles competition at the 1995 Pan American Games, followed by silver medal in men's doubles with partner Thomas Reidy losing the 1995 Pan Am Games final to Canadians Anil Kaul & Iain Sydie. He finally won a gold medal at the 1999 Pan American Games in men's singles, beating Canadian Stuart Arthur in the final and also a gold medal in men's doubles with partner Howard Bach at the 2003 Pan American Games beating the pair from Guatemala Pedro Alejandro Yang and Erick Anguiano in the final.

Pan Am Badminton Championships

Kevin Han won gold in both singles and doubles at two Pan Am Badminton Championships in Calgary 1997 and Lima 2001.

National Championships
Kevin Han was first place in seven singles and three doubles U.S. National Badminton Championships. In the 1994, 1995, 1997, 1998, 1999, 2000 & 2002 he took the U.S. National Men's singles titles and in 1996 & 1997 (with Tom Reidy), and in 1999 (with Alex Liang) and also in 2001, 2002 & 2004 (with Howard Bach) he took the Men's doubles U.S. National badminton titles.

References
 Kevin Han at Sports Reference

American male badminton players
Badminton players at the 1996 Summer Olympics
Badminton players at the 2000 Summer Olympics
Badminton players at the 2004 Summer Olympics
American sportspeople of Chinese descent
1972 births
Living people
Badminton players from Shanghai
Badminton players at the 1995 Pan American Games
Badminton players at the 1999 Pan American Games
Badminton players at the 2003 Pan American Games
Pan American Games gold medalists for the United States
Pan American Games silver medalists for the United States
Pan American Games bronze medalists for the United States
Pan American Games medalists in badminton
Olympic badminton players of the United States
Medalists at the 1995 Pan American Games
Medalists at the 1999 Pan American Games
Medalists at the 2003 Pan American Games